Rojas is a town located in the north-east of the Buenos Aires Province, Argentina. It is the administrative seat of Rojas Partido.

Geography

Climate 
The town has a humid subtropical climate.

External links

 Municipal website

Populated places in Buenos Aires Province
Populated places established in 1777